Hintelmannomyia is a genus of wood midges in the family Cecidomyiidae. The one described species - Hintelmannomyia aestimata - is only known from Australia. The genus was established by Mathias Jaschhof in 2010.

References

Cecidomyiidae genera

Taxa named by Mathias Jaschhof
Insects described in 2010
Monotypic Diptera genera
Diptera of Australasia
Insects of Australia